Me gustas tú (English: I like you) may refer to:

 "Me Gustas Tu" (GFriend song), a 2015 single by GFriend from the EP Flower Bud
 "Me Gustas Tú" (Manu Chao song), a 2001 single by Manu Chao from the album Próxima Estación: Esperanza
 "Me Gustas Tú", a 2010 single by J Balvin from the mixtape J Balvin Mix Tape